Alan Bernstein  (born June 25, 1947) is president and CEO of CIFAR (the Canadian Institute for Advanced Research). He is recognized as a leader in health research, science policy, mentorship and organizational leadership.

Education
Born in Toronto, Bernstein attended Oakwood Collegiate Institute, and then received his BSc. (Honours) and the James Loudon Gold Medal in Mathematics and Physics from the University of Toronto in 1968. He pursued biomedical research and obtained his Ph.D. at the University of Toronto in 1972 under the supervision of James Till with a thesis focusing on a genetic analysis of membrane mutants Escherichia coli.

Career
Following his PhD, Bernstein undertook postdoctoral research in London at the Imperial Cancer Research Fund, where he began working on retroviruses and their oncogenes.

Bernstein returned to Canada in 1974 to join the faculty of the Ontario Cancer Institute. In 1985, he joined the new Samuel Lunenfeld Research Institute at Mount Sinai Hospital as Head of the Division of Molecular and Developmental Biology, and then served as its director of research from 1994 to 2000.

In 2000, Bernstein became the inaugural president of the Canadian Institutes of Health Research (CIHR), where he oversaw the transformation of health research in Canada and championed women, early career scientists, and the importance of interdisciplinary team research.

In 2007, he became the first executive director of the Global HIV Vaccine Enterprise, an alliance of independent organizations around the world dedicated to accelerating the development of a preventive HIV vaccine. As executive director, Bernstein oversaw the enterprise and led the development of the 2010 Scientific Strategic Plan for HIV vaccine development.

In 2012, Bernstein joined CIFAR as president and CEO, where he is responsible for developing and leading the Institute's overall strategic direction. Under his presidency, the organization has grown substantially, launching two Global Calls for Ideas and the CIFAR Azrieli Global Scholars program for early career investigators, as well as expanding the delivery of knowledge mobilization and public engagement activities, and moving in to offices in the MaRS Discovery District.

Bernstein is an active member of many advisory and review boards in Canada, the U.S., U.K., Italy, and Australia, including the Bill & Melinda Gates Foundation and the Lady Davis Institute for Medical Research. He also served as co-chair of the Scientific Advisory Committee for Stand Up to Cancer Canada with Phillip A. Sharp and chairs the Global Health Award Committee for the Gairdner Foundation.

Bernstein is a vocal advocate for interdisciplinary research, early-career investigators, and intellectual freedom. In his public remarks, he often emphasizes the importance of early-career researchers and diversity in science.

Research
Bernstein's research interests have centered on blood cell formation (hematopoiesis), cancer and embryonic development. He has authored more than 225 peer-reviewed scientific publications.

Awards
For his contributions to science in Canada, and internationally, Bernstein has received numerous awards, including:

 Fellow of the Royal Society of Canada, 1991
 Royal Society of Canada McLaughlin Medal, 1996
 National Cancer Institute of Canada Robert L. Noble Prize, 1997
 Genetics Society of Canada Award of Excellence, 1998
 Australian Society of Medical Research Medal, 2001
 Officer of the Order of Canada, 2002 
 Queen Elizabeth II Golden Jubilee Medal, 2002
 Medaille du merite from the Institut de Recherche Clinique de Montréal, 2007
 Gairdner Wightman Award, 2008
 Queen Elizabeth II Diamond Jubilee Medal, 2012
 Canadian Medical Hall of Fame, 2015
 Henry G. Friesen International Prize in Health Research, 2017
Order of Ontario, 2017
 Honoree at Public Policy Forum Testimonial Dinner and Awards, 2019

He is also the recipient of honorary degrees from Dalhousie University (2007), the University of British Columbia (2009), the University of Ottawa (2009), McGill University (2010), Queen's University (2013), the University of Sherbrooke (2014), the University of Toronto (2019), and Western University (2019).

References 

1947 births
Living people
Canadian medical researchers
Fellows of the Royal Society of Canada
Officers of the Order of Canada